Varifula fulvaria is a species of moth of the family Tortricidae. It is found in Valparaíso Region, Chile.

References

Moths described in 1852
Euliini
Endemic fauna of Chile